Fleming House is a historic home located near Smyrna, New Castle County, Delaware.  It was built about 1830, and is a -story, five-bay frame dwelling with a two-story frame wing.  The main house has a center hall plan and interior end chimneys.  It features a number of exterior and interior Greek Revival style details.  Also on the property are a contributing two-story, Late Victorian frame barn and two sheds.

It was listed on the National Register of Historic Places in 1980.

References

Houses on the National Register of Historic Places in Delaware
Greek Revival houses in Delaware
Houses completed in 1830
Houses in New Castle County, Delaware
1830 establishments in Delaware
National Register of Historic Places in New Castle County, Delaware